"By Tomorrow" is a single by British singer Sandie Shaw. This was her first single of the 1970s after a highly successful string of singles the previous decade. Although it is a favourite amongst fans and was featured on Top of the Pops at the time of its release, it was not a commercial success.

Sandie Shaw songs
Songs written by Mitch Murray
Songs written by Peter Callander
1970 songs
Pye Records singles